Bokescreek Township or Bokes Creek Township is one of the seventeen townships of Logan County, Ohio, United States. As of the 2010 census, the population was 1,338.

Geography
Located in the northeastern corner of the county, it borders the following townships:
Hale Township, Hardin County - north
Washington Township, Union County - northeast
York Township, Union County - southeast
Perry Township - south
Rushcreek Township - west
Taylor Creek Township, Hardin County - northwest

Parts of the villages of West Mansfield and Ridgeway are located in southeastern and northern Bokescreek Township respectively.

Name and history
Bokescreek Township was formed in 1837 from Perry Township, and named after Bokes Creek. It is the only Bokescreek Township statewide.

Government
The township is governed by a three-member board of trustees, who are elected in November of odd-numbered years to a four-year term beginning on the following January 1. Two are elected in the year after the presidential election and one is elected in the year before it. There is also an elected township fiscal officer, who serves a four-year term beginning on April 1 of the year after the election, which is held in November of the year before the presidential election. Vacancies in the fiscal officership or on the board of trustees are filled by the remaining trustees.  In the elections of November 2007, Darrell Ramsey and Joseph Ramsey were elected without opposition to the positions of township trustee and township fiscal officer respectively.

Transportation
State Routes 47 and 292 pass through Bokescreek Township.

References

External links
Bokescreek Fire Department
County website
County and township map of Ohio
Detailed Logan County map

Townships in Logan County, Ohio
Populated places established in 1838
1838 establishments in Ohio
Townships in Ohio